Mogontiacopsitta is a genus of prehistoric parrot which existed in Mainz Basin, Germany during the late Oligocene or early Miocene. It was described by Gerald Mayr in 2010, from an incomplete tarsometatarsus. The type species is Mogontiacopsitta miocaena.

References

Bird genera
Parrots
Prehistoric birds of Europe
Fossil taxa described in 2010
Oligocene life
Miocene birds
Taxa named by Gerald Mayr